Utah State Route 105 (SR-105) is a state highway in the U.S. state of Utah. It was created in 1965 to serve as a short connector route between Interstate 15 and SR-106 in downtown Centerville.

Route description 
Parrish Lane begins at a diamond interchange with Legacy Parkway west of Interstate 15 and becomes SR-105 at a diamond interchange with I-15. SR-105 heads due east, passing through a heavily commercial district before coming to an end at the intersection with SR-106. Parrish Lane continues as a local road beyond this intersection. 

Traffic on Parrish Lane between I-15 and SR-106 has decreased 17 percent between 2002 and 2007, with an average of 16,605 cars per day using Parrish Lane in 2007, compared to 20,000 cars per day in 2002. Eleven percent of the traffic on Parrish Lane is bus and truck traffic.

History 
The highway was established in 1965 as a connector from I-15 to SR-106 in Centerville. It remained essentially unchanged until it was extended westward to connect to the newly constructed Legacy Parkway in 2008.

As of 2017, the highway thoroughfare Parrish Lane section is home to the commercial district of Centerville, Utah. Major businesses include Walmart, Target, Home Depot, PetSmart, Kohl's and several smaller retail businesses. Restaurants include the California burger chain In-N-Out, Chick-fil-A, McDonald's, Wendy's, Arby's and several other fast food offerings. In addition, several professional businesses including real estate, insurance and service based businesses can be found.

Major intersections

References 

105
 105
Streets in Utah